Thaís de Campos (born November 7, 1963) is a Brazilian actress, producer, and film director.

Career 
Her first job in TV was in the novel Elas por Elas (1982).

She then attended the novels Final Feliz (1983), Voltei pra Você (1983), Livre para Voar (1984), Ti Ti Ti (1985), Mania de Querer (1986), Bambolê (1987), Tieta (1989), Mulheres de Areia (1993), A Viagem (1994), Salsa e Merengue (1996), Pecado Capital (1998) and Kubanacan (2003).

She also participated miniseries of the Tenda dos Milagres (1985), Desejo (1990) and O Quinto dos Infernos (2002), and some episodes of the show Você Decide.

Since 2000, she lives in Portugal, where he directs the course on "Interpretation for TV and Cinema". The course was created in Lisbon in school "Arte6", where he teaches Brazilian actress along with a team of technicians and actors. The course aims to provide training in areas such as soap operas, commercials or presentation programs. Besides directing this course, Thais also produces television series and performs with students attending the course. Meanwhile, his production - Thais Field Audio Visual, Inc. - set up in 2003, which included musical theater for children, comedies and dramas.

When he moved to Portugal, Thais had a two-year-old daughter. There, in 2004, became pregnant with her second daughter.

In 2006, Thais presented in Lisbon, two pieces produced by her, a child, "The Book of Magik" and "Le Club Chez Moi."

In 2007, part of the novel Duas Caras of Rede Globo.

In 2008, Thais Campos joined the cast of the season in São Paulo's play "O Nosso Amor a Gente Inventa".

In 2009, the actress part of the cast of the miniseries Cinquentinha, the Globo.

In 2011, was in the miniseries Lara com Z, and is currently in the novel Fina Estampa, with the character Alice.

In 2012 he made his 1st participation in Malhação interpreting Vilminha, mother Fatinha.

In 2014 returns the television in the novel Boogie Oogie with character Célia.

Filmography

Television

Films

References

External links 

1956 births
Living people
People from Brasília
Brazilian telenovela actresses